John Joseph Aloysius Colahan (30 March 1836–19 November 1918) was Surgeon Major General in the British Army.

Family
The eldest of the four children of Professor Nicholas Colahan (1806–1890), and his first wife, Sarah Colahan (1814–49), née Whistler, John Joseph Aloysius Colahan was born in Galway, Ireland on 30 March 1836. His three siblings were; Mary Josephine Colahan (1843–1912), Francis Colahan (1843–), and William Henry Colahan (1848–).

He married Eliza McDowell Orr (1859–1899), a concert pianist, in Malta, in 1885. They had six children: Mary Margarita Colahan (1886–1965); Beatrice Clare Colahan (1889–1984); Frederick John Orr Colahan (1892–1982); John Maurice Orr "Jack" Colahan (1894–1917); the artist, Colin Cuthbert Orr Colahan (1897–1987); and Basil Nicholas Orr Colahan (1898–1980).

Medical career
Colohan graduated M.D. at Queen's University, Galway in 1857, and served as an army surgeon in India, Gibraltar and Malta.

Colahan served as Principal Medical Officer in Ireland. The family moved from Dublin to Cape Town in 1889, then to Victoria, Australia in 1896.

Death
He died at St Kilda, Victoria on 19 November 1918.

Footnotes

References
 The Colahans - A Remarkable Galway Family, Diarmuid Ó Cearbhaill, Journal of the Galway Archaeological and Historical Society, volume 54, 2002, pp. 121–140.
 Kinnane, Gary (1996), Colin Colahan: A Portrait, Carlton South: Melbourne University Press. 

People from County Galway
Irish military doctors
British Army major generals
Irish emigrants to colonial Australia
British Army regimental surgeons
Royal Army Medical Corps officers
1836 births
Year of death missing
Place of birth missing
Irish healthcare managers
Alumni of the University of Galway